A Luz do Tom is a 2013 Brazilian documentary film directed by Nelson Pereira dos Santos.

Based on the book Antonio Carlos Jobim: um Homem Iluminado, written by Helena Jobim, the documentary follows the life and work of Antonio Carlos Jobim, better known as Tom Jobim. It discusses the relationship of the conductor and composer with women, including his sister, Helena Jobim, and his two wives, Teresa and Ana.

References

External links
 
 

2013 documentary films
2013 films
Brazilian biographical films
Brazilian documentary films
Documentary films about singers
2010s Portuguese-language films
Films directed by Nelson Pereira dos Santos
Antônio Carlos Jobim